Bjelojevići may refer to:

 Bjelojevići, Stolac, a village in Bosnia and Herzegovina
 Bjelojevići, Montenegro, a village near Mojkovac